This article describes the qualification procedure for EuroBasket 2017.

Qualification format
All teams which didn't qualify yet for EuroBasket 2017 were divided into six groups of four teams and one more of three. The winners of each group and the four best second-placed teams qualified for the final tournament.

Kosovo made its first international appearance while Albania and Cyprus came back to the competition after absenting from the last edition.

Russian Basketball Federation was suspended by FIBA in July 2015, but later their membership was restored in November 2015.

Seedings
In the qualifying round, 27 teams were drawn into six groups of four teams and one group of three teams. The winners of each group and the four best second-placed teams qualified for EuroBasket 2017. The games were played between 31 August and 17 September 2016.

Teams were seeded following the results in the last EuroBasket or qualifiers.

 Teams marked in bold have qualified for EuroBasket 2017.

Squads

Groups
All times are local.

Group A

Group B

Group C

Group D

Group E

Group F

Group G

Ranking of second-placed teams
Matches against the fourth-placed team in each group were not included in this ranking.

Statistical leaders

Individual tournament highs

Points

Rebounds

Assists

Blocks

Steals

Minutes

Individual game highs

Team tournament highs

Points

Rebounds

Assists

Blocks

Steals

Team game highs

References

External links
Official website

qualification
2016–17 in European basketball
2017
August 2016 sports events in Europe
September 2016 sports events in Europe